The 2009–10 Japan Figure Skating Championships was the 78th edition of the event. It took place between December 25 and 27, 2009 at the Namihaya Dome arena in Kadoma, Osaka. Skaters competed in the disciplines of men's singles, ladies' singles, pair skating, and ice dancing on the senior level for the title of national champion of Japan. The event was also used to choose the Japanese teams to the 2010 World Championships and the 2010 Four Continents Championships, as well as being among the competition results used to determine the team to the 2010 Winter Olympics. The Japanese team to the 2010 World Junior Championships was chosen at the Japanese Junior Championships.

Competition notes
The following junior skaters were invited to compete at the senior championships: Yuzuru Hanyu, Kento Nakamura, Ryuju Hino, Fumiya Itai, Keiji Tanaka, and Yoji Tsuboi in men's singles, and Kanako Murakami, Haruka Imai, Yukiko Fujisawa, Kako Tomotaki, and Karen Kemanai in ladies' singles. Shoma Uno, who placed third in junior men, and Satoko Miyahara, who placed fourth in junior ladies, were not invited due to being novice skaters.

Results

Men

Ladies

Pairs

Ice dancing

Japan Junior Figure Skating Championships
The 2009–10 Japan Junior Figure Skating Championships were the Japanese National Championships for the junior level for the 2009–10 season. They were the 78th Japan Junior Championships. They took place at the Shinyokohama Skate Center in Yokohama from November 21 through 23, 2009. The results of this competition were used to choose the Japanese team to the 2010 World Junior Championships.

The following skaters placed high enough at Novice Nationals and so were invited to compete at Junior Nationals: Shoma Uno (1st in novice, 3rd in junior), Shuu Nakamura (2nd in novice, 23rd in junior) for the men; and Ayana Yasuhara (1st in novice, 28th in junior), Risa Shoji (2nd in novice, 10th in junior), Riona Kato (3rd in novice, 7th in junior), and Satoko Miyahara (4th in novice, 4th in junior) for the ladies.

Men

Ladies

Ice dancing

International team selections

Winter Olympics
The Olympic team was announced as follows:

World Championships
The World Championships team was announced as follows:

Four Continents Championships
The Four Continents Championships team was announced as follows:

World Junior Championships
The World Junior Championships team was announced as follows:

External links
 2009–10 Japan Figure Skating Championships results
 2009–10 Japan Junior Figure Skating Championships results
 2009–10 Japan Novice Figure Skating Championships results 
 2009–10 Japan Figure Skating Championships results  at the Japan Skating Federation

2009
2009 in figure skating
2010 in figure skating
Figure Skating Championships 2009
Figure Skating Championships 2009